Somewhere in Sonora is a 1933 American Pre-Code Western film directed by Mack V. Wright and starring John Wayne. It is a remake of the 1927 silent film of the same name. The story was based on a 1925 novel named "Somewhere South" by Will Levington Comfort.

Cast
 John Wayne as John Bishop
 Henry B. Walthall as Bob Leadly
 Shirley Palmer as Mary Burton
 J. P. McGowan as Monte Black
 Paul Fix as Bart Leadly
 Ralph Lewis as Mr. Kelly Burton
 Frank Rice as Riley
 Billy Franey as Shorty

See also
 John Wayne filmography

References

External links
 
 
 
 

1933 films
1933 Western (genre) films
Remakes of American films
American Western (genre) films
American black-and-white films
Films directed by Mack V. Wright
Films shot in Lone Pine, California
Sound film remakes of silent films
Warner Bros. films
1930s English-language films
1930s American films